George Arthur Dahlgren (April 17, 1887 – January 16, 1940) was a football player in the National Football League. 

Dahlgren was born in La Crosse, Wisconsin. He was the eldest son of Edwin Dahlgren, who was born in Sweden, and Pauline, who was an immigrant from Norway. He played at the collegiate level at Beloit College and the University of Wisconsin–La Crosse. Dahlgren played for the Kenosha Maroons, Rock Island Independents and the Hammond Pros from 1924 to 1926 as a guard and tackle.

References

1887 births
1940 deaths
Beloit Buccaneers football players
Hammond Pros players
Kenosha Maroons players
Rock Island Independents players
Wisconsin–La Crosse Eagles football players
Sportspeople from La Crosse, Wisconsin
American people of Swedish descent
American people of Norwegian descent
Players of American football from Wisconsin